Rhys-James Roy Fenlon (born 2 November 2001) is an English professional footballer who plays as a midfielder for Accrington Stanley.

Career
Born in Salford, Fenlon started his career at Parkwydnn Juniors before joining Accrington Stanley's youth set-up at under-8s level. He later played youth football for Manchester City and Burnley. Fenlon returned to Accrington Stanley in September 2020 on a two-year contract. On 4 February 2021, Fenlon joined National League North side Southport on a youth loan until 6 March 2021. On 17 August 2022, Fenlon joined National League North side Chorley on a one month loan.

Personal life
A keen Thai-boxer, Fenlon won national championship belts at age-group level.

References

2001 births
Living people
English footballers
Manchester City F.C. players
Hanwell Town F.C. players
Burnley F.C. players
Southport F.C. players
Accrington Stanley F.C. players
Association football midfielders
English Football League players
Chorley F.C. players